Within radio technology, LTR (Logic Trunked Radio) Standard systems have no dedicated control channel.  All control data is sent as subaudible data along with voice transmissions.  Systems can have any number of channels from 1 through a maximum of 20.  Each channel in the system is assigned a unique number (01 through 20) and these need not be sequentially assigned.  Each subscriber radio must be programmed with all channels in the system in proper logical channel order (the same requirement as EDACS systems).

LTR Standard Talkgroups are written in the format A-HH-GGG.

 "A" is the area code and is either 0 or 1.  The area code is the same for all Talkgroups in a given system and is arbitrarily chosen by the system operator; the most common use is to simply distinguish between Talkgroups on multiple systems.
 "HH" is the home repeater number and has twenty possible values, 01 through 20. Talkgroups usually use their home repeater by default, unless the repeater is already in use by other Talkgroups.  If the home repeater is in use, the controller will assign another free repeater at random.  If no repeater is free (all are in use), then the radio will receive a busy signal.
 "GGG" is the group number and has 254 possible values, 001 through 254.

References

Logic Trunked Radio